In project management, scope is the defined features and functions of a product, or the scope of work needed to finish a project. Scope involves getting information required to start a project, including the features the product needs to meet its stakeholders' requirements.

Project scope is oriented towards the work required and methods needed, while product scope is more oriented toward functional requirements. If requirements are not completely defined and described and if there is no effective change control in a project, scope or requirement creep may ensue.

Scope management is listing the items to be produced or tasks to be done; their required quantity, quality, and variety; the time and resources available and agreed upon; and modifying the variable constraints by dynamic flexible juggling in the event of changed circumstances.

See also 
Cost overrun
Requirements management
Scope statement

References 

Project management